Anabel Medina Garrigues was the defending champion, but lost in the second round to Silvia Soler Espinosa.

Kaia Kanepi won the tournament, defeating in the final Carla Suárez Navarro 3–6, 7–6(8–6), 6–4.

Seeds

Draw

Finals

Top half

Bottom half

Qualifying

Seeds

Qualifiers

Lucky loser
  Sloane Stephens

Qualifying draw

First qualifier

Second qualifier

Third qualifier

Fourth qualifier

References 
Main Draw
Qualifying Draw

Estoril Open - Singles
2012 Women's Singles
Estoril Open